Operation Interflex is the operational code name for the British-led multinational military operation to train and support the Armed Forces of Ukraine. It is a successor to Operation Orbital (2015–2022) and began in July 2022. Unlike its predecessor, Operation Interflex takes place within the United Kingdom and is supported by contingents from international partners.

Background

Prior to the launch of Operation Interflex, the United Kingdom trained and supported the armed forces of Ukraine through Operation Orbital. This operation was launched in 2015 in response to the Russian annexation of Crimea. Based in Ukraine, British military instructors, primarily from the British Army, provided training on medical, logistical, intelligence and infantry skills with the ultimate goal of ensuring Ukraine's territorial integrity. The operation ran concurrently with similar efforts of international partners in the Joint Multinational Training Group — Ukraine (JMTG-U).

In February 2022, amid a buildup of Russian forces on the Ukrainian border, the UK supplied Ukraine with anti-tank weapons; training was provided for these as part of Operation Orbital. On 17 February 2022, the UK announced that Operation Orbital had been suspended due to fears of Russia launching a "no notice" attack. By its end, the operation had provided training to approximately 22,000 Ukrainian military personnel.

On 17 June 2022, during a visit to Kyiv, Prime Minister Boris Johnson offered Ukraine a new training programme, this time located within the UK, with the aim of training up to 10,000 Ukrainians every 120 days.

History
Operation Interflex began on 9 July 2022, led by the British Army's 11th Security Force Assistance Brigade. Approximately 1,050 British military personnel were placed on standby to assist with training, which is held at several sites across the UK. To assist with training, the UK government rapidly procured AK variant rifles, similar to those used by Ukrainian forces.

By 30 June? 2022, approximately 450 Ukrainian troops had received training in the UK. This training reportedly focused on the use of UK-supplied weaponry, including M270 Multiple Launch Rocket Systems.

On 11 November 2022, it was reported that approximately 7,400 Ukrainian military personnel had completed training in the UK.

The training received has received praise by the Ukrainian military; according to Brigadier Justin Stenhouse, who oversees the training programme, one Ukrainian commander informed him about a recent frontline incident where 10 Ukrainian soldiers came under Russian attack but stood firm and “took the fight to the Russians, while the others took cover”. This inspired the rest of their platoon to join the fight and, after the Russians had been repelled, the commander asked them why they had done this, to which they replied: “This is what we were taught to do in UK training.”

The Royal Navy is also contributing to the programme with Ukrainians being trained in maritime skills, such as damage control, minehunting and weapon drills. In October 2022, Russia accused British naval specialists of providing "guidance and leadership" to Ukraine in its attacks against Sevastopol Naval Base on 29 October.

On 15 January 2023, the British government announced another package of military aid for Ukraine, which included 14 Challenger 2 main battle tanks. Ukrainians began arriving for training on the tanks in early February. During the same month, it was also announced that training would be expanded to marine infantry and fighter pilots. By 16 February 2023, British and international trainers had trained 10,000 Ukrainian recruits.

International assistance

On 4 August 2022, Canada joined New Zealand and the Netherlands in sending a contingent to assist with the UK-led training programme. Approximately 170 soldiers were sent to the UK under Operation UNIFIER, primarily from Princess Patricia's Canadian Light Infantry. The New Zealand contingent initially amounted to around 29 troops, with their instruction focusing on the L118 light gun, donated by both the UK and New Zealand. It was later announced, on 15 August, that this contingent would be expanded by a further 120 troops to deliver infantry training.

The UK invited the member states of the UK Joint Expeditionary Force to contribute to the training programme; on 7 August 2022, Sweden accepted its invite and announced it would send 120 instructors. This was followed a day later by a commitment from Finland to send 20 instructors. On 10 August, Denmark further announced that it would join the training mission, sending 130 instructors. On 11 August, Germany, Latvia and Norway announced they would be joining the training progamme. Due to this, the UK announced it would be possible to train more Ukrainians than initially planned. On 25 August, Lithuania announced that it would be providing 15 instructors in September and aiming to train up to 150 Ukrainian specialists through October.

On 27 October 2022, Australia announced it would be sending 70 military instructors to join the UK-led training programme from January 2023.

See also
 Ukraine–United Kingdom relations
 European Union Military Assistance Mission in support of Ukraine
 Ukraine Defense Contact Group
 Operation Unifier

References

21st-century Royal Air Force deployments
British Army deployments
Non-combat military operations involving the United Kingdom
War in Donbas
Russo-Ukrainian War
Ukraine–United Kingdom relations
Reactions to the 2022 Russian invasion of Ukraine